"You're the Reason" is a song by Bobby Edwards, released as a single in the United States in 1961. The song reached number four on the Hot C&W Sides chart and number 11 on the Hot 100 chart.

Chart performance

Bobby Edwards

Joe South

Hank Locklin

Johnny Tillotson

Cover versions
The tune was later covered by Arthur Alexander, Gerry and the Pacemakers, Joe South, Johnny Tillotson, Hank Locklin, Hank III and John Fogerty on his album The Blue Ridge Rangers.

References

1961 singles
Bobby Edwards songs
Joe South songs
Hank Locklin songs
Johnny Tillotson songs
Songs written by Terry Fell
1961 songs
Crest Records singles